Parade is an unincorporated community in Dewey County, in the U.S. state of South Dakota.

History
A post office called Parade was established in 1923. The community's name is a corruption of the name of George Paradis, a French settler.

Notable people
Norm Van Brocklin, an American football player and coach, was born in Parade in 1926.

Oren L. Lesmeister, Minority Whip of the South Dakota House of Representatives.

References

Unincorporated communities in Dewey County, South Dakota
Unincorporated communities in South Dakota